Aside from the toys in the Lego Bionicle franchise, Lego has also marketed a book series, several video games (mostly for the Game Boy Advance), and four computer-animated movies which feature important plot points.  A Bionicle comic book was also published by DC Comics and made available free to members of the Lego Club with some issues of the Lego Magazines. Some comic issues were also posted on the official Bionicle website, Bionicle.com.  There are also various other ancillary products available, such as watches, toothbrushes, and backpacks, as well as online adventure games.  Much of the additional content for Generation 1 that was originally available on the now inactive official websites Bionicle.com and BionicleStory.com is now available on an unofficial website called BioMedia Project.

Books

Novels

Bionicle Chronicles

Bionicle Adventures

Bionicle Legends

Bionicle Super Chapter Books

Lego Bionicle

Collected

Young Readers series

Guidebooks

Activity books

Comics

Bionicle

Ignition

Glatorian

Graphic novels

Bionicle

Two additional graphic novels, Power of the Great Beings and Journey's End, were planned but ultimately cancelled due to poor sales. They would have included the last two issues of the Glatorian comic series as well as new material.

Lego Bionicle

Collected

Films 

 A film based on Bionicle's 2001 storyline was planned prior to the franchise's launch, but never reached production.
 The Legend Reborn was originally planned as the first film in a new trilogy, but its sequels were scrapped following Lego's decision to discontinue the Bionicle toy line. A screen treatment for what would've been the second film was released online.

Soundtracks

TV series

Video games

Console

Canceled

Online

Mobile

Trading card game 
During the first year of the BIONICLE toyline, in 2001, McDonald's distributed packets of cards with their 'kids' meals. There were five cards in each one: four regular, and one holographic or "special" card. The packet came with a mini comic that had an instruction booklet telling the person how to play the game. There was another card game that was sold (instead of collected, like the above) which included a board along with other accessories to play the game.

In 2008 LEGO also distributed the "Phantoka Trading Card Game", which were given away for free in little packages which included about six trading cards with a picture and information of one of the Toa Nuva, Makuta, Av-Matoran or Shadow Matoran. The package also included one holographic card, which featured the combination of a Phantoka and a Matoran. The packages were given away for free in many toy stores in Europe if bought in a Phantoka set.

Music 

Composers Paul Hardcastle and Simon Fuller produced the music for the Bionicle commercials used between 2001 and 2004, which also featured in the Mata Nui Online Game released throughout 2001. An official Bionicle album – featuring music from the bands Cold and Woven and singers Rob Zombie and Kenna – from was originally planned for release in 2002, but the project was scrapped when disagreements arose between the Lego Group and the label Interscope Records.

In 2005, the band All Insane Kids released the songs "Hero" and "Caught in a Dream", produced and written by Morten Krog Helgesen. The latter is played in the end credits of Bionicle 3: Web of Shadows. Between 2006 and 2007, artists such as The All-American Rejects, Daughtry and Niels Brinck contributed songs for Bionicle commercials, but the success of the song "Creeping in My Soul", sung by Danish singer Christine Lorentzen for Bionicle's Barraki toy campaign, led to the formation of the rock band Cryoshell, who produced music for the theme up until its original discontinuation, and in its wake released their self-titled debut album.

Music for the first three Bionicle films – Mask of Light (2003), Legends of Metru Nui (2004) and Web of Shadows (2005) – was composed by Nathan Furst. Soundtracks for all three films were digitally released in 2017. Music for the fourth film The Legend Reborn (2009) was composed by John D'Andrea, while Mike Raznick scored the 2016 streaming series Lego Bionicle: The Journey to One.

More media 
Besides the movies, books, comics etc., there are other ways parts of the Generation 1 story have been told. Much of this content is now available on the unofficial BioMedia Project website.

Reading materials 
Bionicle.com had some information about parts of the Generation 1 story, including some character biographies.

BionicleStory.com had several sections containing information about the Generation 1 characters, locations, and more. Among the offerings were also story serials and "blog" chapters, the latter being each one or two pages of story text styled as a journal entry from one of the fictional Bionicle characters.

Audio 
Bionicle.com had two downloadable MP3s (as well as two PDF files with the "lyrics" to the MP3s) that describe the rise the giant robotic body of Mata Nui out of its slumber and his exile from said body when Makuta Teridax took it over in the Generation 1 plotline.

BionicleStory.com also had many podcasts recorded by Bionicle writer Greg Farshtey available for download in the "Latest Story" area of the site that tell much of the Generation 1 story.

On the homepage for Bionicle.com, there was a collection of audio recordings, called the Mata Nui Saga, that told some of Mata Nui's story. Each one had a picture, text, and music with it. They were split into thirty-four "chapters", each narrated in-character by Michael Dorn (reprising his role of Mata Nui from The Legend Reborn)

There were also downloadable songs and other things on the website that were inspired by different sections of the Generation 1 storyline.

Notes

References 

Media
Bionicle
Bionicle